Arricam is a 35 mm movie camera line manufactured by Arri.

Description
It is Arri's flagship sync-sound camera line, replacing the Arriflex 535 line. The design was developed by Fritz Gabriel Bauer and Walter Trauninger, and is heavily derivative of the cameras Bauer created for his Moviecam company, which was bought out by Arri in the mid-1990s. As such, the Arricam is a fusion of the mechanical and intuitive design innovations of the Moviecam and the interchangeable accessories and complex electronic integration of the Arriflex. , the Arricam is considered, along with the Panaflex Millennium line, the top sync-sound camera system currently in usage, and is extremely popular amongst bigger budget feature films. 
The line comprises two camera body models, the ST (Studio) and LT (Lite). The Arricam ST is intended as a full-capability camera, including two camera magazine mounting configurations, whereas the Arricam LT is optimized for smaller, lightweight usage in handheld and Steadicam application, with only the option to mount the magazine in the rear position. Both cameras use motorized displacement magazines, have electronic rotating mirror shutters mounted beneath the film gate (as opposed to beside it, as in Panavision cameras), and contain independently adjustable sprocket pulleys within the camera body.

Movie cameras
Cameras introduced in 2000
German inventions